Memorias de un visitador médico is a 1980 film directed by Luis María Delgado. It stars  Andrés García and Amparo Muñoz. The screenplay is based on a 1969 book by José de Lugo.

Cast
 Andrés García as José de Lugo
 Amparo Muñoz as Magdalena
 Anaís de Melo as patient
 Helga Liné as Elvira Coro

External links

References 

 

1980 films
1980s Spanish-language films
Mexican sex comedy films
Films directed by Luis María Delgado
1980s Mexican films